Thorondor may refer to:

 Thorondor (Middle-earth), the Lord of Eagles in Tolkien's Middle-earth
 Thorondor (moon), the only known moon of the trans-Neptunian object Manwë